Anthony Chan Wai Hin (born 19 January 2001) is a former Hong Kong professional footballer who played as a defender.

Career statistics

Club

Notes

References

External links
 Yau Yee Football League profile

Living people
2001 births
Hong Kong footballers
Association football defenders
Hong Kong Premier League players
Happy Valley AA players
Hong Kong FC players